The 2008-09 Israeli Basketball State Cup was the 49th edition of the Israeli Basketball State Cup, organized by the Israel Basketball Association. 26 teams took part in the competition. The semifinals and finals were played at the Nokia Arena in Tel Aviv.

Hapoel Holon defeated Maccabi Haifa 69-68 in the final, Brian Tolbert hitting a three point buzzer beater to win the match. It was Hapoel Holon's 1st Israeli State Cup, after losing 5 finals.

Preliminary round
4 Liga Leumit teams have been drawn to play a preliminary round to earn a spot in the main draw.

Main draw
Following IBA's rules, the current champions, Hapoel Holon, and the cup holders, Hapoel Jerusalem, have been drawn straight into the quarterfinals, into different halves of the draw. Two other random teams, Maccabi Tel Aviv and Hapoel Afula, have been drawn straight into the second round.

Semifinals

Final

See also
Israeli Basketball State Cup
2008–09 Israeli Basketball Super League

2008-09
State Cup